The Flying Doctor is a popular British radio series that aired on the BBC Light Programmes about the Australian flying doctor service. It started in 1958 and went on until 1963.

The show was very popular in Britain and influenced their image of Australians.

It was adapted from the TV series The Flying Doctor (1959).

Episodes went for half an hour.

Many episodes were written by Rex Rienits. It was produced by Vernon Harris.

Cast
Bill Kerr as the pilot
James McKechnie as Chris Rogers, a doctor recently arrived from England
June Brunnell as sister
Bettina Dickson
Rosemary Miller

References

British radio dramas